The Henschel Hs 123 was a single-seat biplane dive bomber and close-support attack aircraft flown by the German Luftwaffe during the Spanish Civil War and the early to midpoint of World War II. It proved to be robust, durable and effective especially in severe conditions. It continued to see front-line service until 1944, only to be withdrawn due to a lack of serviceable airframes and spare parts (production ended in 1940).

Design and development
Henschel was a German locomotive manufacturer. Soon after Hitler's rise to power, Henschel decided to start designing aircraft, one of the first being the Hs 123. The aircraft was designed to meet the 1933 dive bomber requirements for the reborn Luftwaffe. Both Henschel and rival Fieseler (with the Fi 98) competed for the production contract requirement, which specified a single-seat biplane dive bomber. The first prototype, the Hs 123V1, was cleared for its maiden flight on 1 April 1935; General Ernst Udet, a World War I ace, flew it  on its first public demonstration flight on 8 May 1935.  The first three Henschel prototypes, with the first and third powered by 485 kW (650 hp) BMW 132A-3 engines and the second by a 574 kW (770 hp) Wright Cyclone, were tested at Rechlin in August 1936. Only the first prototype had "smooth" cowlings; from that point on, all aircraft had a tightly fitting cowling that included 18 fairings covering the engine valves. The Henschel prototypes did away with bracing wires and although they looked slightly outdated with their single faired interplane struts and cantilever main landing gear legs attached to smaller (stub) lower wings, the Hs 123 featured an all-metal construction, clean lines and superior maneuverability. Its biplane wings were of a "sesquiplane" configuration, whereby the lower wings were significantly smaller than the top wings.

The overall performance of the Hs 123 V1 prototype prematurely eliminated any chance for the more conventional Fi 98, which was cancelled after a sole prototype had been constructed. During testing, the Hs 123 proved capable of pulling out of "near-vertical" dives; however, two prototypes subsequently crashed due to structural failures in the wings that occurred when the aircraft were tested in high-speed dives. The fourth prototype incorporated improvements to cure these problems; principally, stronger centre-section struts were fitted. After it had been successfully tested, the Hs 123 was ordered into production with a 656 kW (880 hp) BMW 132Dc engine.

The Hs 123 was intended to replace the Heinkel He 50 biplane reconnaissance and dive bomber as well as acting as a  "stop-gap" measure until the Junkers Ju 87 became available. As such, production was limited and no upgrades were considered, although an improved version, the Hs 123B, was developed by Henschel in 1938. A proposal to fit the aircraft with a more powerful 716 kW (960 hp) "K"-variant of its BMW 132 engine did not proceed beyond the prototype stage, the Hs 123 V5. The V6 prototype fitted with a similar powerplant and featuring a sliding cockpit hood was intended to serve as the Hs 123C prototype.

Production 
The Hs 123 was manufactured at Henschel's Schönefeld and Johannistal factories. The first production Hs 123 were delivered in 1936. About 265 aircraft were produced. Production of the Hs 123A ended in Autumn 1938. A prototype Hs 123B and a prototype Hs 123C were produced just before production of the Hs 123A ended.

Some were exported to China, and 14 were transferred to the Spain Nationalist Air Arm.

Operational history

Prior to World War II

A small pre-production batch of Hs 123A-0s was completed in 1936 for service evaluation by the Luftwaffe. This initial group was followed by the slightly modified Hs 123A-1 series, the first production examples. The service aircraft flew with an armoured headrest and fairing in place (a canopy was tested in the Hs 123V6) as well as removable main wheel spats and a faired tailwheel. The main weapon load of four SC50 50 kg (110 lb) bombs could be carried in lower wing racks along with an additional SC250 250 kg (550 lb) bomb mounted on a "crutch" beneath the fuselage. The usual configuration was to install an auxiliary fuel "drop" tank at this station that was jettisoned in emergencies. Two 7.92 mm (.312 in) MG 17 machine guns were mounted in the nose synchronized to fire through the propeller arc.

The aircraft entered service at StG 162 in autumn 1936. Its career as a dive bomber was cut short when the unit received its first Ju 87A the next year. Remaining Hs 123s were incorporated into the temporary Fliegergeschwader 100 at the time of the Munich Crisis. The Geschwader (wing) had been created as an emergency measure, equipped with obsolete aircraft and tasked with the ground attack role. With the signing of the Munich agreement, the crisis was over and the geschwader was disbanded, the gruppen being transferred to other established units. By 1939, despite its success in Spain, the Luftwaffe considered the Hs 123 obsolete and the schlachtgeschwader (close-support wings) had been disbanded with only one gruppe, II.(Schl)/LG2 still equipped with the Hs 123.

Spanish Civil War
During the same time, at the request of Oberst (later Generalfeldmarschall) Wolfram von Richthofen, chief of staff of the Legion Condor, five aircraft had been deployed to Spain as a part of the Legion Condor, intended to be used as tactical bombers.

In their intended role, the Hs 123s proved to be somewhat of a failure, hampered by their small bomb capacity and short range. Instead, the Hs 123s based in Seville were used for ground support, a role in which their range was not such a detriment, and where the ability to accurately place munitions was more important than carrying a large load. The combat evaluation of the Hs 123 demonstrated a remarkable resiliency in close-support missions, proving able to absorb a great deal of punishment including direct hits on the airframe and engine. The Nationalists in Spain were impressed with the Hs 123's performance in battle, purchasing the entire evaluation flight and ordering an additional 11 aircraft from Germany. The Spanish Hs 123s were known as "Angelito" (dear angel or little angel), and at least one Hs 123 was in service with the Ejército del Aire (Spanish Air Force) after 1945.

Second Sino-Japanese War
Twelve Hs 123s were also exported to China, where they were used extensively as dive bombers by the temporarily-organized 15th Squadron of the China Central Air Force Academy Group, operating against Imperial Japanese warships along the Yangtze River, especially in 1938.

World War II

Service from Poland to Greece 
At the outbreak of hostilities, the surviving 39 Hs 123s assigned to II. (Schl)/LG 2, were committed to action in the Polish Campaign. This single unit proved to be particularly effective. Screaming over the heads of enemy troops, the Hs 123s delivered their bombs with devastating accuracy. A frightening aspect of an Hs 123 attack was the staccato noise of its engine that a pilot could manipulate by changing rpm to create "gunfire-like" bursts. The Hs 123 proved rugged and able to take a lot of damage and still keep on flying. Operating from primitive bases close to the front lines, the type was considered by ground crews to be easy to maintain and reliable in field conditions.

The Polish campaign was a success for an aircraft considered obsolete by the Luftwaffe high command. Within a year, the Hs 123 was again in action in the blitzkrieg attacks through the Netherlands, Belgium and France. General Heinz Guderian was continually impressed by the quick turnaround time offered by II.(Schl)/LG 2. Often positioned as the Luftwaffes most-forward based combat unit, the Hs 123 flew more missions per day than other units, and again proved their worth in the close-support role. With Ju 87s still being used as tactical bombers rather than true ground support aircraft and with no other aircraft capable of this mission in the Luftwaffe arsenal the Hs 123 was destined to continue in service for some time, although numbers were constantly being reduced by attrition.

The Hs 123 was not employed in the subsequent Battle of Britain as the English Channel proved an insuperable obstacle for the short-ranged aircraft. The sole operator, II.(Schl)/LG 2 went back to Germany to re-equip with the Messerschmitt Bf 109E fighter bomber (Jabo) variant. The Bf 109E fighter bomber was not capable of carrying any more bombs than the Hs 123. It did, however, have a greater range and was far more capable of defending itself. On the downside were the notoriously tricky taxiing, ground handling, and takeoff/landing characteristics of the Bf 109, which were exacerbated with a bomb load.

At the beginning of the Balkans Campaign, the 32 examples of the Hs 123 that had been retired after the fall of France were taken back into service to equip 10.(Schl)/LG 2. The aircraft performed well enough to warrant its use in Operation Barbarossa.

Eastern Front service 

At the start of Operation Barbarossa, the single Gruppe of the Luftwaffe that was dedicated to ground support was II.(Schl)/LG 2, operating 22 Hs 123s (along with 38 Bf 109Es). In service use on the Eastern Front, the remaining aircraft had been field-modified with the main wheel spats removed, additional armour and extra equipment fitted as well as mounting extra machine guns and even cannons in under-wing housings.

Some volunteers of Escuadrilla Azul (15 Spanische Staffel/VIII. Fliegerkorps) of JG-27 detached in Luftflotte 2 managed Hs 123s in collaboration of II.(Schl.)/LG 2 units for ground strikes along Bf 109E-7/B fighter-bombers during 1941–42 period.

During the initial drive, the unit participated in action along the central and northern parts of the front, including a brief time in support of the fighting around Leningrad, and participating in the battles for Bryansk and Vyazma. The first weeks revealed problems associated with using the Bf 109E which was plagued by undercarriage and engine problems in the fighter-bomber role. Its liquid-cooled inline engine was also more vulnerable to small arms fire than the Hs 123's radial.

The winter brought hardship to all German forces in Russia, and the pilots in the open cockpits of the Henschels suffered accordingly. Despite this, they took part in the Battle of Moscow. In January, the unit was re-designated as the first dedicated ground attack wing (in German Schlachtgeschwader 1, SchlG 1). The Hs 123 became a part of 7./SchlG 1.

This "new" unit participated in operations in Crimea in May 1942, after which it operated on the southern sector for some time, participating in the Second Battle of Kharkov and going on to take part in the Battle of Stalingrad. In the meantime, the small number of operational Hs 123 continued to slowly dwindle. Aircraft had been salvaged from training schools and even derelict dumps all over Germany to replace losses. The aircraft that had supposedly replaced the Hs 123, the Ju 87, also started to be assigned to ground support units, leaving tactical bombing to newer aircraft.

The greatest tribute to the Hs 123 usefulness came in January 1943 when Generaloberst Wolfram von Richthofen, then commander-in-chief of Luftflotte 4, asked whether production of the Hs 123 could be restarted because the Hs 123 performed well in a theater where mud, snow, rain and ice took a heavy toll on the serviceability of more advanced aircraft. However, the Henschel factory had already dismantled all tools and jigs in 1940.

After taking part in the Battle of Kursk, SG 1 returned to Crimea, and there during late spring 1944, they finally gave up the aircraft that had served all over Europe from Spain to Leningrad. 7./SG 1 traded its last Hs 123s in mid-1944, for Ju 87s, a type that was to have replaced it back in 1937.

By 1945, the Hs 123s that remained serviceable were reassigned to secondary duties such as supply dropping and glider towing.

Legacy
The Henschel Hs 123 showed that a slow but rugged and reliable aircraft could be effective in ground attack. Despite its antiquated appearance, the Hs 123 proved useful in every World War II battlefield in which it fought.

No Hs 123s are known to have survived.

Follow-on designs

The success of the Hs 123 in the Spanish Civil War led the RLM to put out a request for a successor aircraft. At this point in history, the exact role of aircraft in support of the army was still being developed. This was perhaps the first dedicated attack aircraft design which was intended to fulfill the close air support role in the niche between the tactical bomber and the dive bomber. The successor chosen was the Henschel Hs 129.

Operators
  Republic of China
 Republic of China Air Force – operated 12 aircraft using them as dive bombers.
  Nazi Germany
 Luftwaffe
  Spanish State
 Spanish Air Force – purchased the Condor Legion's remaining aircraft, and ordered an additional 11 aircraft from Germany. On the Eastern Front, volunteers of Escuadrilla Azul (15 Spanische Staffel/VIII Fliegerkorps) of JG 27 based in Vitebsk operated Hs 123's alongside II.(Schl.)/LG 2 units.

Specifications (Hs 123A-1)

See also

References

Bibliography
 Eden, Paul and Soph Moeng, eds. The Complete Encyclopedia of World Aircraft. London: Amber Books, 2002. .
 Fitzsimmons, Bernard, ed.  "Hs 123, Henschel." The Illustrated Encyclopedia of 20th Century Weapons and Warfare. New York: Columbia House, 1967.
 Franco, Lucas Molina. Henschel HS 123 (Perfiles Aeronáuticos 2: La Máquina y la Historia) (in Spanish with English captions). Valladolid, Spain: Quiron Ediciones, 2006. .
 Green, William. Warplanes of the Second World War, Volume Nine: Bombers. London: Macdonald & Co. (Publishers), 1968 (fourth impression 1972). .
 Green, William. Warplanes of the Third Reich. London: Macdonald and Jane's Publishers, 1970 (fourth impression 1979). .
 Gunston, Bill. An Illustrated Guide to German, Italian and Japanese Fighters of World War II: Major Fighters and Attack Aircraft of the Axis Powers. New York: Arco Publishing, 1980. .
 Gunston, Bill. The Encyclodepia of the Worlds Combat aircraft'''. New York: Chartwell Books, 1976.
 Gunston, Bill and Tony Wood. Hitler's Luftwaffe. London: Salamander Books, 1977. .
 Höfling, Rudolf. Henschel Hs 123: Die Geschichte eines legendären Schlachtflugzeuges (Flugzeug Profile 42) (in German). Stengelheim, Germany: Unitec Medienvertrieb, 2004.
 Ledwoch, Janusz. Henschel Hs 123 (Wydawnictwo Militaria 4) (in Polish with English captions. Warszawa, Poland: Wydawnictwo Militaria, 1995. .
 Lepage, Jean-Denis G.G. Aircraft of the Luftwaffe, 1935–1945: An Illustrated Guide. McFarland & Co, 2009 ISBN 978-0786439379.
 "Legacy of Udet...The Henschel HS 123". Air International, Vol. 15, No 2, August 1978, pp. 72–79. Bromley, UK: Fine Scroll.
 Shepherd, Christopher. German Aircraft of World War II with Colour Photographs. Edinburgh: Sidgwick & Jackson, 1975. .
 Smith J. R. and Anthony Kay. German Aircraft of the Second World War. London: Putnam & Company, 1972. .
 Taylor, John W. R. "Henschel Hs 123." Combat Aircraft of the World from 1909 to the present. New York: G.P. Putnam's Sons, 1969. .
 Weal, John.  "Eastern Front Schlachtflieger."  Wings of Fame, Vol. 7. London: Aerospace Publishing, 1997. .
 Winchester, Jim. "Henschel Hs 123." Aircraft of World War II: The Aviation Factfile.'' Kent, UK: Grange Books, 2004. .

External links

 Luftwaffe Resource Center: Henschel Hs 123
 Henschel Hs 123

Hs 123
1930s German attack aircraft
Single-engined tractor aircraft
World War II ground attack aircraft of Germany
World War II dive bombers
Aircraft first flown in 1935